Chikhali Assembly constituency is one of the 288 constituencies of Maharashtra Vidhan Sabha and one of the seven which are located in Buldhana district.

It is a part of the Buldhana Lok Sabha constituency along with five other Vidhan Sabha (assembly) constituencies, viz. Buldhana,  Sindkhed Raja,   Mehkar, Khamgaon and Jalgaon (Jamod),

The seventh Malkapur from the Buldhana district is a part of the Raver Lok Sabha constituency from neighbouring Jalgaon district.

As per orders of Delimitation of Parliamentary and Assembly constituencies Order, 2008, No. 23 Chikhli Assembly constituency is composed of the following: 1. Chikhli Tehsil (Part), Revenue Circle - Undri, Amdapur, Eklara, Hatni, Kolara, Chikhli and Chikhli (MC), 2. Buldhana Tehsil (Part), Revenue Circle - Raipur, Dhad and Mhasla Bk of the Buldhana district.

Rahul Siddhvinayak Bondre of the Indian National Congress represents the constituency in the 13th Maharashtra Legislative Assembly, Chikhli constituency is considered as bastion of Congress Party as Rahul Bondre won it in tough "Modi wave".

Shweta Vidyadhar Mahale of Bharatiya Janata Party won in this constituency in 2019 Maharashtra Assembly Election with many votes than sitting MLA of Indian National Congress and destroyed 15 Years Bastion.

Members of Legislative Assembly

Election Results 

2019

2014

2009

2004

1999

1995

1990

1985

1980

1978

1972

See also 
Chikhli, Maharashtra

Notes

Assembly constituencies of Maharashtra